Charito (flourished mid-4th century AD) was a Roman Empress, consort of Jovian, Roman Emperor. Some historians doubt whether Charito was granted the title of Augusta as no archaeological evidence as yet confirms it.<ref name="Jovian page 364">Select Works of Emperor Julian (1786), English anthology including a translation of the History of Jovian, p. 364. See also de La Bléterie, J. P., Histoire de Jovien, 1740, i. p. 1-238; and Garland, Lynda, Byzantine Empresses: Women and Power in Byzantium, AD 527-1204, Psychology Press, 1999, p. 229. .</ref>

Name
Charito's name does not appear in Ammianus Marcellinus, one of the main sources for the reign of her husband. The earliest source recording her name appears to be the "Chronographikon syntomon" of Nikephoros I of Constantinople. The earliest Latin source doing so was a translation of the chronographikon by Anastasius Bibliothecarius. Timothy Barnes considers her absence from the account of Ammianus to reflect her lack of political influence. Barnes notes that Ammianus does not name Albia Dominica, wife of Valens, whose influence was also limited.

Family

According to Ammianus and Zosimus, Charito was a daughter of Lucillianus. Lucillianus was a military commander situated in Sirmium during the late reign of Constantius II. He had served as a commander in a conflict with the Sassanid Empire in 350. He then served as comes domesticorum under Constantius Gallus.

In 358 -359, Lucillianus and Procopius formed the second embassy sent by Constantius to Shapur II, negotiating terms of peace and returning without results.According to Ammianus:"On these very same days Prosper, Spectatus, and Eustathius, who had been sent as envoys to the Persians (as we have shown above), approached the king on his return to Ctesiphon, bearing letters and gifts from the emperor, and demanded peace with no change in the present status. Mindful of the emperor's instructions, they sacrificed no whit of the advantage and majesty of Rome, insisting that a treaty of friendship ought to be established with the condition that no move should be made to disturb the position of Armenia or Mesopotamia. Having therefore tarried there for a long time, since they saw that the king was most obstinately hardened against accepting peace, unless the dominion over those regions should be made over to him, they returned without fulfilling their mission. Afterwards Count Lucillianus was despatched, together with Procopius, at that time state secretary, to accomplish the self-same thing with like insistence on the conditions; the latter afterwards, bound as it were by a knot of stern necessity, rose in revolution. - The Roman History of Ammianus Marcellinus, vol. 1, Book 17, chapter 14. 1935 translation; "When our scouts had returned there, we found in the scabbard of a sword a parchment written in cipher, which had been brought to us by order of Procopius, who, as I said before, had previously been sent as an envoy to the Persians with Count Lucillianus. In this, with intentional obscurity, for fear that, if the bearers were taken and the meaning of the message known, most disastrous consequences would follow, he gave the following message: Now that the envoys of the Greeks have been sent far away and perhaps are to be killed, that aged king, not content with Hellespontus, will bridge the Granicus and the Rhyndacus and come to invade Asia with many nations. He is naturally passionate and very cruel, and he has as an instigator and abetter the successor of the former Roman emperor Hadrian;unless Greece takes heed, it is all over with her and her dirge chanted." ; "This writing meant that the king of the Persians had crossed the rivers Anzaba and Tigris, and, urged on by Antoninus, aspired to the rule of the entire Orient. When it had been read, with the greatest difficulty because of its excessive ambiguity, a sagacious plan was formed." - The Roman History of Ammianus Marcellinus, vol. 1, Book 18, chapter 6. 1935 translation Lucillianus later attempted to counter the advance of Julian and his forces against Constantius. He was defeated however and was dismissed from the Roman army when Julian rose to the throne.

Ammianus and Zosimus give two slightly different accounts on the role of the imperial father-in-law in the brief reign of Jovian. Lucillianus was reinstated and received orders to move to Mediolanum. In secret, Jovianus also asked him to "take with him some men selected for their tried vigour and loyalty, with the view of making use of their support as the condition of affairs might suggest".

The return of Lucillianus to action would result in his death sometime later. He was killed by his own men after a false rumour indicated that Julian was still alive.

According to Zosimus, Lucillianus was murdered for being the bearer of the bad news about the death of Julian. The two accounts differ in the location of the death, Rheims or Sirmium, and on which units were responsible. Ammianus leaves it vague while Zosimus points at specific units.

Empress

Charito married Jovian, a son of Varronianus. Her father-in-law was tribune of the Jovians and comes domesticorum. Varronianus retired into private life during the reign of Julian. Jovian had also pursued a military career, serving as primicerius domesticorum under Julian. They had at least one son, also named Varronianus. Philostorgius claims that Varronianus was one of two sons. The other son is not named. However this brief mention is the only source mentioning or suggesting the existence of a second son.

On 26 June 363, Julian was mortally wounded in the Battle of Samarra. He died a few hours following the end of the conflict. He was childless and had never designated an heir. On 27 June, the remaining officers of the campaign proceeded to elect a new emperor, selecting Jovian for unclear reasons. Charito became the new empress.

Jovianus and the younger Varronianus served as Roman Consuls in 364. The Dictionary of Christian Biography and Literature to the End of the Sixth Century by Henry Wace notes Charito and their son had joined the Emperor by the end of 363, a fact that can be determined by a passage of Themistius. But Joannes Zonaras reports that Charito and Jovian did not meet each other during his reign, a possible error according to the Dictionary.Ammianus records:"When the emperor had entered Ancyra, after the necessary arrangements for his procession had been made, so far as the conditions allowed, he assumed the consulship, taking as his colleague in the office his son Varronianus, who was still a small child; and his crying and obstinate resistance to being carried, as usual, on the curule chair, were an omen of what presently occurred."The Roman History of Ammianus Marcellinus, vol. 2, Book 25, chapter 10. 1940 translation. The historian interprets the crying consul as an ill omen, preceding the early death of Jovian. On 17 February 364, Jovian died at Dadastana and various accounts have survived debating the manner of his death. Ammianus, for instance, compares his death with that of Scipio Aemilianus and seems to have suspected murder.

Eutropius reports that Jovian "by the kindness of the emperors that succeeded him, was enrolled among the gods", which indicates the practice of the Imperial cult continued at least to this point in time. Zonaras reports both Jovian and Charito buried in the Church of the Holy Apostles, Constantinople.

WidowThe History of the Decline and Fall of the Roman Empire'' by Edward Gibbon reports that:

The reference to Varronianus being half-blind comes from the "Homilies on Philippians" by John Chrysostom. "Another again, his successor, was destroyed by noxious drugs, and his cup was to him no longer drink, but death. And his son had an eye put out, from fear of what was to follow, though he had done no wrong." Louis-Sébastien Le Nain de Tillemont was the first to identify the poisoned emperor with Jovian and the son with Varronianus. Gibbon and others have followed this interpretation. Tillemont assumed that Varronianus was eventually executed but there is no ancient or medieval text supporting the notion.

The reference to the fate of Charito comes from the "Letter to a Young Widow" by John Chrysostom, written c. 380. 

The original passage is quite vague in not actually naming the emperors or empresses mentioned. The interpretation given by Gibbon and others identifies the two emperors who died of natural causes with Constantine I and Constantius II. The one slain by a usurper was Constans, assassinated by orders of rival emperor Magnentius. The one killed in battle is thought to be Constantine II. The one assassinated by his guards was Jovian, since Chrysostom expressed the same belief in another of his texts. The one killed by the man who elevated him to the purple was Constantius Gallus, created Caesar by Constantius II and later executed by orders of the same emperor. The empress trembling for the life of her son is thought to be Charito. The one returning from exile is tentatively identified with Marina Severa, first wife of Valentinian I and mother of Gratian. However the identification is very doubtful in this case as her life following her divorce is not recorded by other sources.

Bleterie considered Charito to have been a Christian and comments "no one had ever more need of the solid consolations which Christianity alone can give".

References

External links
Section about her in "Ammianus Marcellinus and the Representation of Historical Reality" by Timothy David Barnes
Section mentioning him in "Exploratio"
The section of the "History of Jovian" mentioning her fate as a widow
Page of Philostorgius mentioning the two sons of Jovian and Charito
Page of "Failure of the Empire" giving the sources for the sons of Jovian and Charito

4th-century Christians
4th-century Roman empresses
Burials at the Church of the Holy Apostles
Romans from unknown gentes